The 2015 Slovak Cup Final (known as the Slovnaft Cup for sponsorship reasons) was the final match of the 2014–15 Slovak Cup, the 46th season of the top cup competition in Slovak football. The match was played at the NTC Poprad in Poprad on 1 May 2015 between FK AS Trenčín and FK Senica. AS Trenčín defeated FK Senica 3-2 after penalties.

Road to the final

Match

Details 

Assistant referees:
  Tomáš Somoláni
  Gabriel Ádám
Fourth official:
  Karol Poláček

References

Slovak Cup Finals
Cup Final
Slovak Cup
Slovak Cup
May 2015 sports events in Europe
Slovak Cup Final 2015